Just Say Yo was Sire Records' Volume 2 of Just Say Yes and was originally released on August 16, 1988, as a winter CD sampler. It contained remixes and non-album tracks of artists on the label, most of which were considered new wave or modern rock (all would eventually fall under the genre alternative rock).

Track listing
 Galbi (Coldcut remix) - Ofra Haza
 Will Never Marry - Morrissey
 Black Coffee - k.d. lang
 Behind the Wheel/Route 66 [Mega-Single Mix] - Depeche Mode
 Bible Dreams - The Wild Swans
 Chains of Love [Truly in Love with the Marks Bros. Mix] - Erasure
 Tubular Bells/Pretty Boys and Pretty Girls [Regan's House Me Mix]—Book of Love
 Hot Dog [12" Remix] - Martini Ranch
 Mexican Women - Throwing Muses
 Call Me Blue - A House
 Inside Out [Live] - The Mighty Lemon Drops
 What For - James
 Kingdom Chairs - The Soup Dragons
 Bacchanal Lady [Extended Remix]—David Rudder

It is volume two in the Just Say Yes series of promotional compilations, of which each title was a variation on the 'Just Say' theme:

Just Say Yes Volume I: Just Say Yes (1987)
Just Say Yes Volume III: Just Say Mao (1989)
Just Say Yes Volume IV: Just Say Da (1990)
Just Say Yes Volume V: Just Say Anything (1991)
Just Say Yes Volume VI: Just Say Yesterday (1992)
Just Say Yes Volume VII: Just Say Roe (1994)

References

1988 compilation albums
Alternative rock compilation albums
Sire Records compilation albums